Creaca is a commune located in Sălaj County, Crișana, Romania.

Villages
The commune is composed of nine villages: Borza (Egregyborzova), Brebi (Beréd), Brusturi (Somróújfalu), Ciglean (Csiglen), Creaca, Jac (Zsákfalva), Lupoaia (Farkasmező), Prodănești (Prodánfalva) and Viile Jacului (Szállásszőlőhegy). The largest village in terms of population and area is Jac, and the smallest is Viile Jacului.

History
In the 1st century AD, Porolissum, an ancient Roman city in Dacia was built on the western part of the commune. The city was the most north-eastern outpost of the Roman Empire, and garrisoned 5,000 auxiliary soldiers transferred from Spain, Gaul, and Britain.

Demographics

At the 2002 census, 97.8% of inhabitants were Romanians and 2.1% Roma. 71.1% were Romanian Orthodox, 13.8% Baptist, 12.5% Pentecostal and 2.1% stated they belonged to another religion.

Education
There is a primary school (grades 1 to 8) in Creaca and Jac and only 1-4 grades in the rest of the villages, except Viile Jacului.

Occupations
The main occupations involve the farms around the village. Most of the men are gone to work in other European Union countries. The ones who stayed work in Zalău, commuting between Zalău and the commune's villages. In the communist era, the people worked mostly in Zalău and on state farms.

Gallery

References

External links
Official site

Communes in Sălaj County
Localities in Crișana